Reginald Johnson (born December 16, 1989) is an American basketball player who is currently playing for Dunkin' Raptors of the TBL. He played college basketball for the Miami Hurricanes.

Professional career
In October 2014, Johnson signed with SPM Shoeters Den Bosch of the DBL.

In November 2015, he signed with the Malaysian team Westports Malaysia Dragons of the ASEAN Basketball League.

In June 2016, Johnson returned to Southeast Asia, this time to Thailand to play for the Mono Vampire Basketball Club of the Thailand Basketball League. However, at early January 2018, Johnson left the club to return to the United States due to personal reasons. He was eventually replaced by Maltese-Italian Samuel Deguara.

In March 2018, Johnson signed with the Rain or Shine Elasto Painters of the Philippine Basketball Association as their import for the 2018 PBA Commissioner's Cup.

Statistics

References

External links
DBL Profile 
Eurobasket profile
DraftExpress profile

1989 births
Living people
American expatriate basketball people in Malaysia
American expatriate basketball people in the Netherlands
American expatriate basketball people in the Philippines
American expatriate basketball people in Thailand
American men's basketball players
Basketball players from Winston-Salem, North Carolina
Centers (basketball)
Delaware 87ers players
Dutch Basketball League players
Heroes Den Bosch players
Kuala Lumpur Dragons players
Miami Hurricanes men's basketball players
Philippine Basketball Association imports
Rain or Shine Elasto Painters players